Michael Fuchs may refer to:

 Michael J. Fuchs (born 1946), American television executive, former head of HBO
 Michael Fuchs (football) (1972–2011), Austrian football manager and retired footballer
 Michael Fuchs (badminton) (born 1982), German badminton player
 Michael Fuchs (politician) (1949–2022), German parliamentarian and Bundestag member
 Michael Fuchs (sculptor), sculpted the Medal of Suleiman in 1554
 Michael Fuchs (figure skater), German ice dancer, 1974 German gold medalist